The Colorado Convention Center (CCC) is a multi-purpose convention center located in Downtown Denver, Colorado.  At 2,200,000 square feet (total space) it is currently the 12th largest convention center in the United States. It opened in June 1990; the first event being the NBA Draft for the Denver Nuggets. The convention center was expanded in 2004 to include several meeting rooms, two ballrooms and an indoor amphitheater. Since opening, the center hosts an average of around 400 events per year. Centrally located in the city, it has become one of Denver's many landmarks due to its architecture and is adjacent to the Denver Performing Arts Complex and is just blocks away from the Colorado State Capitol, Auraria Campus and the 16th Street Mall.  The CCC is directly served via light rail by RTD's Theatre District–Convention Center station.

Background
The  Colorado Convention Center is owned by the City and County of Denver but is privately managed by ASM Global since 1994 
 The convention center opened in June 1990 with an exhibition hall, five meeting rooms and a main ballroom, totaling .

2004 expansion
The Colorado Convention Center underwent a $340 million major expansion that was completed in December 2004.
The CCC also boasts an attached 1,000 space, 3-level parking structure as well as its own RTD (Regional Transportation District) Light Rail stop. Across Welton Street, on the historic registry, is the Denver Athletic Club.

2021 to 2023 expansion
Starting in mid-2021 the convention center began construction on a new expansion project.  Upon completion this will include new flexible meeting and ballroom space of approximately 85,000 square feet, 100,000 square feet of new pre-function and service space, and a 50,000 square foot outdoor terrace to be located on the roof of the existing convention center which will provide unobstructed views of both downtown and the mountains.  In all, approximately 235,000 square feet of usable space will be added bringing the total usable floor area to around 2.5 million when the project is completed in 2023.  This would make the facility the seventh largest in the U.S. using today's convention center statistics. The expansion will be completely integrated into the existing CCC footprint and involves no outward expansion of the current facility.

Public art
A public art collection is featured throughout the interior and exterior of the convention center. The most visible work is I See What You Mean by Lawrence Argent, located on the north east side of the convention center just to the left of the main entrance on 14th Street. Erected in June 2005, the -tall polymer-concrete-clad sculpture is in the form of a lapis-lazuli-colored bear pushing its nose and paws against the glass facade, attempting to peer inside. Its installation was part of the Denver Office of Cultural Affairs' Public Art Program. This collection is featured on many of Denver's cultural tours.

Location
The CCC is bounded by 14th Street, Speer Boulevard, Champa Street and Welton Street. Stout Street runs underneath the building, as does the (RTD) Light Rail's Central Corridor. Currently the D, F and H lines run through this corridor's stop. The CCC is linked by a pedestrian bridge across Champa Street to the Denver Performing Arts Complex with its nine theatres. It is across Welton Street from the Emily Griffith Opportunity School. The University of Colorado Denver, Metropolitan State University of Denver, and the Community College of Denver are all located to the west across Speer Boulevard at the Auraria Campus. The Colorado Convention Center is central to many other downtown attractions including: the 16th Street Mall, the Denver Pavilions, the LoDo (Lower Downtown) district, the Pepsi Center- home of the Colorado Avalanche, Denver Nuggets, Colorado Crush and the Colorado Mammoth,  Coors Field- home of the Colorado Rockies, Denver's Downtown Aquarium, Elitch Gardens amusement park, and the Denver Botanic Gardens.

Facilities

Exhibit Hall
The "Exhibit Hall" is the main facility at the convention center. The space consists of six individual halls spanning 90,000 to 100,000sqft. The space is primarily used for trade shows, conventions and product launches

Mile High Ballroom
The "Mile High Ballroom" is the largest ballroom in Denver and the convention center. The space can hold up to 3,000 guests for catered events and up to 5,000 for general admission. The ballroom features a state-of-the-art lighting system that provides the illusion of the night sky. The space is primarily used for banquets, conferences and intimate music events. The space was renovated in 2004 as part of the convention center's overall expansion plan. The venue's namesake derives from the Korbel Champagne Cellars.

Four Seasons Ballroom
The "Four Seasons Ballroom" was the newest ballroom, completed as part of the convention center's expansion plan. The space can hold up to 3,500 guests. The venue is primarily used for banquets and fundraising events. It is home to numerous graduation ceremonies for Denver area schools including: The Art Institute of Colorado, Community College of Denver, Metropolitan State University of Denver, Regis University and the University of Colorado Denver.

Frequent events
The CCC hosts hundreds of events each year from local community luncheons to national conventions. Some of the annual events include:
 Great American Beer Festival
 Outdoor Retailer
 Colorado Thespian Conference
 Colorado State Spelling Bee
 Graduation Ceremonies for Denver Public Schools, Auraria Campus Schools, Westwood College, The Art Institute of Colorado, University of Phoenix, and Regis University.
Holiday Food and Gift Festival
Denver Auto Show
Denver Boat Show
Denver Comic Con
Colorado Prayer Luncheon
Colorado Garden and Home Show
Colorado Ski and Snow Sports Expo
Salute to Seniors
World Science Fiction Convention

Bellco Theatre

The Bellco Theatre (formerly the Wells Fargo Theatre and The Lecture Hall) is an indoor amphitheatre located in the rear of the Colorado Convention Center. The venue opened March 1, 2005, with its first event by Ron White on March 5, 2005. The amphitheater was a part of the convention center's 2004 expansion plan. Originally known as The Lecture Hall, the venue was renamed in 2007 after banking and financial services company Wells Fargo. The bank purchased naming rights in September 2006 for nearly US$3 million, for a five-year period; beginning January 1, 2007. Beginning November 29, 2012, it was renamed from Wells Fargo Theatre after Bellco Credit Union, one of the largest credit unions in Colorado, purchased the naming rights in 2012.

Initially, the owner of the Paramount Theatre protested construction of the venue (along with the City Lights Pavilion) as he believed it would draw business away from the historic landmark. Since its opening, the venue has become one of the busiest mid-sized concert venues in Metro Denver, alongside the Fillmore Auditorium and 1stBank Center. It is primarily used for concerts desiring an "intimate" setting. The venue was named one of the "Top 100 Worldwide Theatres" by Pollstar in 2007 and 2011. The sculpture Indeterminate Line (2004) by Bernar Venet is located in front of the theatre.

Naming
The Theater at the Colorado Convention Center (Planning/construction)
The Lecture Hall (March 1, 2005—December 31, 2006)
Wells Fargo Theatre (January 1, 2007—November 28, 2012)
Bellco Theatre (November 29, 2012—Present)

Selected events

Al Gore
Alicia Keys
Aziz Ansari
Big Time Rush
Bill Clinton
Bruce Springsteen
The Cheetah Girls
Chelsea Handler
Crosby, Stills and Nash
Dane Cook
David Archuleta
David Gray
David Spade
Demi Lovato

Diana Ross
Dolly Parton
Drake
Drew Carey
Elton John
Gabriel Iglesias
Gorillaz
Il Divo
Jamie Foxx
Jason Mraz
Janet Jackson
Joe Bonamassa
John Legend
Jonas Brothers

Katt Williams
Lady Antebellum
Mary J. Blige
Melissa Etheridge
Meghan Trainor
Neil Young
Nicki Minaj
Rob Thomas
Ron White
Sting
The Trailer Park Boys
Trevor Noah
Tori Amos
Wheel of Fortune

See also
List of convention centers in the United States

References

External links
Colorado Convention Center
Denver Metro Convention and Visitor's Bureau
SMG

Economy of Denver
Buildings and structures in Denver
Convention centers in Colorado
Concert halls in Colorado
Event venues established in 1990
Theatres in Denver
Music of Denver
Music venues in Colorado
Tourist attractions in Denver
Theatres in Colorado
Multi-purpose stadiums in the United States
1990 establishments in Colorado
Buildings and structures completed in 1990